The Boboli Gardens is a historical park of the city of Florence that was opened to the public in 1766. Originally designed for the Medici, it represents one of the first and most important examples of the Italian garden, which later served as inspiration for many European courts. The large green area is a real open-air museum with statues of various styles and periods, ancient and Renaissance that are distributed throughout the garden. It also has large fountains and caves, among them the splendid Buontalenti grotto built by the artist, architect, and sculptor Bernardo Buontalenti between 1536 and 1608.

History and layout

The Gardens, directly behind the Pitti Palace, the main seat of the Medici grand dukes of Tuscany at Florence, are some of the first and most familiar formal 16th-century Italian gardens. The mid-16th-century garden style, as it was developed here, incorporated longer axial developments, wide gravel avenues, a considerable "built" element of stone, the lavish employment of statuary and fountains, and a proliferation of detail, coordinated in semi-private and public spaces that were informed by classical accents: grottos, nympheums, garden temples and the like. The openness of the garden, with an expansive view of the city, was unconventional for its time. The gardens were very lavish, considering no access was allowed to anyone outside the immediate Medici family, and no entertainment or parties are ever known to have taken place in the gardens.

The Boboli Gardens were laid out for Eleonora di Toledo, the wife of Cosimo I de' Medici. The name may be a corruption of "Bogoli" or "Borgoli", possibly the name of a family who had previously owned the land. The first stage had scarcely been begun by Niccolò Tribolo when he died in 1550, after which the construction was continued by Bartolomeo Ammanati. Giorgio Vasari contributed to the planning, and Bernardo Buontalenti contributed sculptures, as well as the elaborate architecture of the grotto in the courtyard that separates the palace from its garden.

The garden lacks a natural water source. To water its  plants, a conduit was built to feed water from the nearby Arno River into an elaborate irrigation system.

The primary axis, centered on the rear façade of the palace, rises on Boboli Hill from a deep amphitheater; its shape resembles half of a classical hippodrome or racecourse. At the center of the amphitheater and rather dwarfed by its position is the Ancient Egyptian Boboli obelisk brought from the Villa Medici at Rome. This primary axis terminates in a fountain of Neptune (known to the irreverent Florentines as the "Fountain of the Fork" for Neptune's trident); the sculpture of Neptune, by Stoldo Lorenzi, is visible against the skyline as a visitor climbs the slope.

Giulio Parigi laid out the long secondary axis, the Viottolone or Cyprus Road at a right angle to the primary axis. This road led up through a series of terraces and water features, the main one being the Isolotto complex, with the bosquets on either side, and then allowed for exit from the gardens almost at Porta Romana, which was one of the main gates of the walled city. In 1617, Parigi constructed the Grotto of Vulcan (Grotticina di Vulcano) along this axis.

The gardens have passed through several stages of enlargement and restructuring work. They were enlarged in the 17th century to their present extent of 45,000 meters² (111 acres). The Boboli Gardens have come to form an outdoor museum of garden sculpture that includes Roman antiquities as well as 16th and 17th century works.

In the first phase of building, the amphitheatre was excavated in the hillside behind the palace. Initially formed by clipped edges and greens, it was later formalized by rebuilding in stone decorated with statues based on Roman myths such as the Fountain of the Ocean (sculpted by Giambologna, later transferred to another location within the same garden). The small Grotto of Madama and the Large Grotto  were begun by Vasari and completed by Ammannati and Buontalenti between 1583 and 1593.

Even while undergoing restoration work in 2015, the Large Grotto's statues were still on display; they are defining examples of Mannerist sculpture and architecture. Decorated internally and externally with stalactites and originally equipped with waterworks and luxuriant vegetation, the grotto is divided into three main sections. The first one was frescoed to create the illusion of a natural grotto, a refuge that allows shepherds to protect themselves from wild animals; it originally housed The Prisoners of Michelangelo (now replaced by copies), statues that were first intended for the tomb of the Pope Julius II. Other rooms in the Grotto contain Giambologna's famous Bathing Venus and an 18th-century group of Paris and Helen by Vincenzo de' Rossi.

The Fountain of Neptune
In the hillside above the amphitheatre is a double ramp, leading to the Fountain of Neptune. Its main feature is a large basin with a central bronze statue of Neptune, made by Stoldo Lorenzi some time between 1565 and 1568. The fountain was constructed contemporaneously with its more famous counterpart, Ammannati's Fountain of Neptune, which is at the corner of the Palazzo Vecchio at the Piazza della Signoria in the center of Florence. Higher up on the hillside is a statue of Abundance (Dovizia). Collectively, these works seem to allude to a legend in which  the gods Athena and Neptune are competing for the role of the patron of Athens. In that legend, Neptune strikes the ground with his trident, causing water to spring forth from it.

Fontana del Bacchino
The Fontana del Bacchino is a 1560 sculptural work by Valerio Cioli (1529-1599) featuring a statue in the likeness of the famed dwarf buffoon from the court of Cosimo I de' Medici, Grand Duke of Tuscany, Nano Morgante modeled after Bacchus and riding a tortoise. In 1572 the statue was turned into a fountain.

The Isolotto
The Isolotto is an oval-shaped island in a tree-enclosed pond, and is nearly at the end of the alternative Viottolone axis. In the centre of the island is the Fountain of the Ocean, and in the surrounding moat, there are statues of Perseus and Andromedae (school of Giambologna). The Isolotto was laid out by Giulio and Alfonso Parigi, circa 1618.

Gallery

Notes

Further reading

Bernardo Buontalenti and the Grotta Grande of Boboli, ed. Sergio Risaliti, Maschietto Editore, Florence, 2012. 
 Marco Vichi In the Boboli Garden, art book for children, illustrated by Francesco Chiacchio, photo by Yari Marcelli, transl. Stephen Sartarelli, Maschietto Editore, Florence, 2015.

External links

 
Giardino di Boboli - a Gardens Guide review
360 degree virtual tour of Boboli Gardens
Article about Boboli Gardens
Florence's Boboli Gardens
Boboli Gardens by Tuscany official tourism website
Museums in Florence-Boboli Gardens

Dacia in art
Gardens in Florence
Italian Renaissance gardens
Palazzo Pitti
Tourist attractions in Florence